Chrysis Michael (born May 26, 1977 in Nicosia, Cyprus) is a Cypriot retired footballer.

Club career
Chrysis Michael started his career from AEL Limassol in 1997 and stayed there until 2003, playing 139 league matches and scoring 25 goals.

In the summer of 2003 he signed with APOEL. He stayed with APOEL for 8 years (2003–2011), he became a captain, he played in 173 league matches and scored 33 goals. With APOEL he managed to win 4 Championships, 2 Cups and 3 Super Cups.

He was the man who drove APOEL towards the 2009–10 UEFA Champions League group stage for first time in their history by scoring two goals against F.C. Copenhagen in GSP Stadium for the second leg of the UEFA Champions League Play-offs. In that match, APOEL won 3-1 and overturned the 1-0 win of F.C Copenhagen in the first game. Chrysis Michael appeared in five official group stages matches of the 2009–10 UEFA Champions League with APOEL.

APOEL supporters and people in Cyprus believe that he is the best transfer of a Cypriot player in the modern history of APOEL .

In May 2011, it was announced that Chrysis Michael was released from the reigning champions APOEL, after serving the club for 8 years. The board of directors of APOEL have announced that for the football year 2011-2012 they are withdrawing the t-shirt with number 33 to honour, the club's ex captain. In an emotional moment Chrysis Michael was also honoured by APOEL ULTRAS in their fanclub where he stated "I am proud to be a part of APOEL's history".

In the summer of 2011, Chrysis signed with Enosis Neon Paralimni and at the end of 2011–12 season he decided to finish his football career.

International career
Chrysis Michael was also an important member of the Cyprus national football team. He has made 69 appearances and scored 7 goals.

Managerial career
He started his managerial career in December 2012 as the coach of Cypriot Fourth Division side Elpida Astromeriti. In summer 2014, he was appointed as the coach of Cypriot Fourth Division club Achyronas Liopetriou. From 1 September 2015 until 24 July 2016, and later from November 2016, he served as the manager of Cypriot Second Division side Olympiakos Nicosia.

Honours
 APOEL
Cypriot First Division (4): 2003–04, 2006–07, 2008–09, 2010–11
Cypriot Cup (2): 2005-06, 2007–08
Cypriot Super Cup (3): 2004, 2008, 2009

References

External links
 

Living people
1977 births
Cypriot footballers
Association football midfielders
AEL Limassol players
APOEL FC players
Enosis Neon Paralimni FC players
Olympiakos Nicosia managers
Cypriot First Division players
Cyprus international footballers
Cypriot football managers
Nea Salamis Famagusta FC managers
Ermis Aradippou FC managers
Karmiotissa FC managers